Conus vayssierei is a species of sea snail, a marine gastropod mollusk in the family Conidae, the cone snails and their allies.

Like all species within the genus Conus, these snails are predatory and venomous. They are capable of "stinging" humans, therefore live ones should be handled carefully or not at all.

The variety Conus vayssierei var. ossea Monterosato, 1917 is a variety of Conus vayssieri characterized by white background color and dots of purple color.

Description
The size of the shell varies between 28 mm and 40 mm.

Distribution
This marine species occurs in the Eastern Atlantic Ocean and in the Mediterranean Sea off North Africa.

References

 Kobelt, W., 1906. Iconogr. Schalentr. Europ. Meeresconch, 4.
 Pallary P., 1904–1906: Addition à la faune malacologique du Golfe de Gabès; Journal de Conchyliologie 52: 212–248, pl. 7; 54: 77–124, pl. 4

External links
 The Conus Biodiversity website
 

vayssierei
Gastropods described in 1906